There have been a number of 19th Divisions in the history of the United States Army.

 19th Division: A National Guard division established in early 1917 consisting of Arizona, California, Colorado, Nevada, New Mexico, and Utah. By the end of that same year, the 19th Division became the 40th Division (later 40th Infantry Division).
 19th Division (World War I): Organized in 1918 as a regular army and national army division for World War I, the 19th Division did not go overseas and demobilized in February 1919 at Camp Dodge, Iowa.
 19th Infantry Division: a "phantom" division in World War II.

During the Second World War the division remained inactive. However, it saw service of a kind as a "phantom division" as part of Allied deception measures. It was assigned to SHAEF for use in Operation Fortitude South, but was never actually utilized during that endeavor.

The division's order of battle included the following fictional units:

 Headquarters, 19th Infantry Division
 572nd Infantry Regiment
 573rd Infantry Regiment
 578th Infantry Regiment
 Divisional Troops

In July 1944 the Division was redesignated as the 109th Infantry Division.

See also
 Formations of the United States Army in the early 20th Century
 Omar Bradley served with this division in World War I

References 

Military units and formations established in 1917
Military units and formations disestablished in 1944
019th Infantry Division, U.S.
United States Army divisions of World War I